Sizer may refer to:
 Sizer Barker, an indie band from Liverpool, England

 Stephen Sizer (born 1953), English author on Judeo-Christian topics
 Ted Sizer (1932–2009), founder of the Essential school movement
 Theodore Sizer (art historian) (1892–1967), American art historian, author

 Mount Sizer, a prominent peak located on Blue Ridge in Henry W. Coe State Park in California
 Crusher, equipment to break and reduce the size of rocks, coals, overburden or other minerals